2,3,6-Trimethylphenol is an organic compound with the formula (CH3)3C6H2OH. As a precursor to vitamin E, it is the most widely used of the several isomers of trimethylphenol. 

2,3,6-Trimethylphenol is produced industrially by the methylation of m-cresol with methanol in the presence of a solid acid.

References

Alkylphenols